Burning Up is a 1930 American Pre-Code action film directed by A. Edward Sutherland and written by Grover Jones and William Slavens McNutt. The film stars Richard Arlen as a racing driver and Mary Brian as his love interest, the daughter of a fellow driver. An early talkie, the film also features motorcycle stunts, and also stars Francis McDonald, Sam Hardy, Charles Sellon, and Tully Marshall. The film was released on February 1, 1930, by Paramount Pictures.

The film was made in an effort by Paramount's Jesse L. Lasky to emulate the success of earlier racing films made by the late Wallace Reid, "emulating Wally's films almost exactly", and with director Allen Sigler having "filmed the racing scenes exactly as Wally's had been done". One review described it as "the old racing-car scenario brought up to date with sound and talk".

Cast
Richard Arlen as Lou Larrigan
Mary Brian as Ruth Morgan
Francis McDonald as 'Bullet' McGhan
Sam Hardy as Windy 'Wally' Wallace
Charles Sellon as James R. Morgan
Tully Marshall as Dave Gentry

References

External links
 

1930 films
American auto racing films
Race films
1930s action drama films
American action drama films
Paramount Pictures films
Films directed by A. Edward Sutherland
American black-and-white films
1930s English-language films
1930s American films